Elizabeth Raper  is a judge of the Federal Court of Australia. She has served as a judge since 1 April 2022. Raper was appointed by then Attorney-General Michaelia Cash to the Sydney Registry of the Federal Court following the retirement of Justice Geoffrey Flick. Raper attended the University of Sydney, earning a Bachelor of Arts in 1996 and a Bachelor of Laws with Honours in 1998. Her legal career began at the Australian Industrial Relations Commission, where she served as an Associate to Justice Paul Munro. She later worked as a lawyer in private practice at Baker and McKenzie. Raper also worked in academia at the University of Sydney and co-authored a text on discrimination law. 

As a Federal Court judge, Raper has presided over a high profile industrial dispute between the government of New South Wales and the Rail, Tram and Bus Union.

References 

Australian lawyers
Australian women judges
21st-century Australian judges
Year of birth missing (living people)
Judges of the Federal Court of Australia
Australian Senior Counsel
Living people